Santiago Carlos Oves (14 September 1941 – 2 May 2010) was an Argentine film director and screenwriter. He directed nine films between 1983 and 2009. His 2004 film Conversations with Mother was entered into the 26th Moscow International Film Festival.

Selected filmography
 Autumn Sun (1996)
 Murdered at Distance (1998)
 The Lighthouse (1998)
 Conversations with Mother (2004)

References

External links

1941 births
2010 deaths
Argentine film directors
Argentine screenwriters
Male screenwriters
Argentine male writers
People from Buenos Aires